David Cannon Evans (February 24, 1924 – October 3, 1998) was the founder of the computer science department at the University of Utah and co-founder (with Ivan Sutherland) of Evans & Sutherland, a pioneering firm in computer graphics hardware.

Biography
Evans was born in Salt Lake City. He attended the University of Utah and studied electrical engineering; he earned his Bachelor of Science in Physics in 1949 and his Doctorate in Physics in 1953. Evans first worked at the Bendix aviation electronics company, where he acted as project manager in 1955 to develop what some describe as an early personal computer that ran on an interpretive operating system. The Bendix G-15 was a bulky unit about the size of a two-door refrigerator. He stayed with the company just long enough to manage the G-20 project.

Evans became a faculty member of the University of California, Berkeley. 
His first important work with graphics dates from that period, when he did several experiments on an IDIOM display hooked up to a Digital Equipment Corporation PDP-5.
In 1963, he was co-Principal Investigator (with Harry Huskey) for project Genie to produce an early multi-user timesharing system. Students from this period include Butler Lampson and L. Peter Deutsch.
The system, which included key developments in the field of virtual memory, was sponsored by the US Defense Department's Advanced Research Projects Agency.

In 1965, the University of Utah recruited him back to start their own computer science department.
When he was building up the University of Utah department in 1968 he managed to convince Ivan Sutherland (who had funded Evans' DARPA research) to come to Utah, accepting the condition that they start a computer graphics company together. Evans retired from the company in 1994.
Evans's students at Utah included Alan Kay, Edwin Catmull, James H. Clark, John Warnock, Alan Ashton, Frank Crow, Jim Blinn, Bui Tuong Phong, Gary Hodgman, and Henri Gouraud.

Evans was a member of the Church of Jesus Christ of Latter-day Saints (LDS Church). He served as a branch president, a counselor in bishoprics and stake presidencies, and as a scout master for a total of 27 years. Evans was awarded the Silver Beaver for his role in scouting.

Evans married Joy Frewin. They had ten children, only seven of which lived to adulthood. One of these is David F. Evans, who became a general authority in the LDS Church. From 1984 to 1990, Joy Evans was a counselor in the general presidency of the Relief Society to Barbara W. Winder. At the time of his death on October 12, 1998, Evans had 39 living grandchildren and great grandchildren.

In 1996, Brigham Young University established the David C. Evans Chair of Computer Engineering and Graphics. Evans was at the ceremony where the founding of a chair in his honor was announced, but due to his suffering from Alzheimer's disease, did not make any remarks at the ceremony.

References

External links

 

American computer scientists
Latter Day Saints from California
20th-century American educators
Computer graphics professionals
University of Utah faculty
University of Utah alumni
University of California, Berkeley faculty
Bendix Corporation people
1924 births
1998 deaths
Scientists from Salt Lake City
Latter Day Saints from Utah